Carman-Ainsworth High School is a high school in Flint Township, Michigan, United States. It is the only high school in the Carman-Ainsworth Community School district.

History
Carman High School opened in 1967. In 1986, the Ainsworth High School student population was combined with Carman and adopted its current name, while Ainsworth became what is now Carman-Ainsworth Middle School.

Demographics
Flint Carman-Ainsworth High School profile 2012-2013

Notable alumni

 Brandon Carr, NFL cornerback for Baltimore Ravens, Dallas Cowboys
 Jeff Hamilton, former MLB player (Los Angeles Dodgers)
 Jon Runyan, former NFL player and U.S. Representative
 Dan Skuta, NFL linebacker for San Francisco 49ers
 Tommy Stewart, drummer for Godsmack, Fuel, Everclear

References

External links
 

Public high schools in Michigan
Educational institutions established in 1967
Schools in Genesee County, Michigan
1967 establishments in Michigan